Weissenau Abbey (German: Kloster Weißenau, Reichsstift Weißenau) was an Imperial abbey (Reichsabtei) of the Holy Roman Empire located near Ravensburg in the Swabian Circle. The abbey, a Premonstratensian monastery, was an Imperial Estate and therefore its abbot had seat and vote in the Reichstag as a prelate of the Swabian Bench. The abbey existed from 1145 until the secularisation of 1802-1803.

History 
The monastery was founded in 1145 by Gebizo of Ravensburg, a ministerialis of the Welfs, and his sister Luitgarde. Its first monks and their provost Herman (1145–75) came from Rot an der Rot Abbey near Memmingen. The monastery buildings were completed in 1156, and in 1172 the church was dedicated to Our Lady and Saint Peter by Otto, Bishop of Konstanz, to whose diocese it then belonged. During the first few years of its existence it had a nunnery attached, but this was transferred to Weissenthal nearby by Provost Herman, where it continued and existed there until the 15th century.

The number of canons at Weissenau increased so rapidly that in 1183 the newly founded monastery of Schussenried Abbey was recruited from there. In 1257 Weissenau was raised to the rank of an abbey, with Henry I (1257–66) as its first abbot. It was granted the status of an "Imperial abbey" (i.e., territorially independent) about this time.

In the 13th and 14th centuries, Weissenau was repeatedly pillaged by warring factions. Its most severe trial came during the German Peasants' War, when the canons were temporarily driven out and the abbot, Jacob Murer (1523–33), was replaced by the peasant Johann Wetzel.

Abbot Leopold Mauch (1704–22) began the rebuilding of the abbey in 1708 and of the church in 1717. The church, which is in the Baroque style, was completed in 1724 by his successor, Michael Helmling (1722–24), and the monastic buildings by Anton Unold (1724–65), of which the "Festsaal", still used for concerts, is of particular note for its elaborate stucco work.

At the time of its secularisation in 1802, it had 27 canons, who administered the parishes of Weissenau, St. Jodock, Bodnegg, Grünkraut, Thaldorf, St. Christian, Gornhofen, Obereschach and Obereisenbach. Its possessions comprised 198 estates and its jurisdiction extended over 137 villages. In all, Weissenau had eight provosts and 41 abbots. Its last abbot, Bonaventure Brem (1794–1802), died on 4 August 1818.

After secularisation the former abbey became the property of the Count of Sternberg-Manderscheid, upon whose death it was bought by the government of Württemberg in 1835, but partly resold and turned into a dressmaking and bleaching concern which continued in operation in parts of the outlying premises until 2006. Since 1892, the principal buildings have been used as an asylum for the insane, the present psychiatric clinic "Die Weissenau", which also occupied the former abbots' summer residence at Rahlenhof until recently.

Procession of the Holy Blood 
Weissenau became very well known on account of the relic of the Blood of Christ which it received from Rudolph of Habsburg in 1283. Up to 1783 the famous Blutritt, similar to that of the neighbouring Weingarten Abbey, took place every year. It consisted of a solemn procession during which the relic was carried by a priest on horseback, accompanied by many other riders and a large crowd. The relic is still preserved in the old abbey church, which now serves as the parish church of Weissenau. Reference to it is made in the medieval epic Lohengrin.

Gallery

References 
  Binder, Helmut (ed.), 1995. 850 Jahre Prämonstratenserabtei Weissenau. 1145–1995. Sigmaringen: Thorbecke. 
  Eitel, Peter (ed.), 1983. Weissenau in Geschichte und Gegenwart. Festschrift zur 700-Jahrfeier der Übergabe der Heiligblutreliquie durch Rudolf von Habsburg an die Prämonstratenserabtei Weissenau. Sigmaringen: Thorbecke. 
  Steinert, Tilman, 1985. Die Geschichte des Psychiatrischen Landeskrankenhauses Weißenau. Darstellung der Anstaltsgeschichte von 1888 bis 1945 im ideengeschichtelichen und sozioökonomischen Kontext. Weinsberg: Weissenhof-Verlag.

Further reading
Elke Wenzel: Die mittelalterliche Bibliothek der Abtei Weißenau. Frankfurt am Main: Peter Lang, 1998,

External links 

  Weissenau Parish
  Die Weissenau Psychiatric Centre
   Acta S. Petri in Augia (history of Weissenau, 1220) at Wikisource
Weissenau Abbey pipe organ by Holzhey (in German
Weissenau Abbey pip organ by Holzhey (in English)[

Premonstratensian monasteries in Germany
Monasteries in Baden-Württemberg
1140s establishments in the Holy Roman Empire
1145 establishments in Europe
Religious organizations established in the 1140s
Imperial abbeys disestablished in 1802–03
Christian monasteries established in the 12th century
States and territories established in the 13th century
Ravensburg